Medauroidea is an Asian genus of stick insects in the family Phasmatidae and subfamily Clitumninae (tribe Medaurini).  Species have been recorded from Indo-China.

Species
The Catalogue of Life and Phasmida Species File list:
 Medauroidea brongniarti (Brunner von Wattenwyl, 1907)
 Medauroidea cattienensis Ho, 2020
 Medauroidea chenshuchuni Ho, 2017
 Medauroidea cornuta Ho, 2020
 Medauroidea dolichocercata (Bi & Wang, 1998)
 Medauroidea extradentata (Brunner von Wattenwyl, 1907) - type species (as Clitumnus extradentatus) - Vietnam
 Medauroidea fasciata Ho, 2020
 Medauroidea nyalamensis (Chen, Shang & Pei, 2000)
 Medauroidea polita (Chen & He, 1997)
 Medauroidea regula (Brunner von Wattenwyl, 1907)
 Medauroidea romantica Bresseel & Constant, 2018

References

External links
 

Phasmatodea genera
Phasmatodea of Asia
Phasmatidae